Clifford W. Snedeker (January 6, 1931 – February 27, 1996) was an American politician who served in the New Jersey General Assembly from the 8th Legislative District from 1974 to 1982.

References

1931 births
1996 deaths
Republican Party members of the New Jersey General Assembly
20th-century American politicians